Sickle Mountain is a  tall mountain standing on the south side of Clarke Glacier and 14 miles (22 km) east of Cape Berteaux, on the west coast of Graham Land. So named by Finn Ronne of the East Base of the United States Antarctic Service (USAS), 1939–41, because its peculiar shape was suggestive of that of a sickle.

See also
Confluence Cone

Mountains of Graham Land
Fallières Coast